Stockspot is an online investment adviser and fund manager based in Sydney, Australia.   It is the first fully paperless digital investment advice platform in Australia and provides consumers with access to professional investment services for less than the typical cost of a traditional financial adviser or wealth manager.

History
Stockspot was founded in 2013 by Chris Brycki, a former portfolio manager at UBS.  He created Stockspot to provide an alternative for consumers in Australia who were being priced out of getting professional investment advice due to high fees, as well as receiving compromised advice. The business follows robo-advisor models similar to Wealthfront and Betterment in the US and Nutmeg in the UK where it provides automated investment advice and portfolio management.

The beta version of its website was launched in September 2013.

In April 2014, Stockspot secured A$250,000 of seed funding from AWI ventures to support its growth strategy.

It was selected to represent Australia at the SWIFT Innotribe Startup Challenge in Singapore in May 2014 and recognised as one of Asia’s top 10 most innovative early stage financial technology companies from over 280 entries.  At the Singapore event, it was chosen as one of the winners from Asia to advance to the Grand Finale at Sibos in Boston in October 2014.

Stockspot was also runner-up in the 2014 Sydstart Startup Pitch Competition  and named the top 25 hottest financial services startups from around the globe by Informilo.

Stockspot completed a second Series A round of venture capital financing in June 2015 adding Rocket Internet and H2 Ventures onto its register.  It was named in the global FinTech100 report by KPMG in December 2015.

It completed another round of capital financing (Series B) in May 2017, led by Exchange-traded fund pioneer and ETF Securities founder Graham Tuckwell and Alium Capital.

Products and services
Stockspot’s platform provides both financial advice and investment management to its customers.  Based on an online questionnaire, it uses software and algorithms to determine the customer’s risk profile and goals.  It recommends an investment strategy and the platform then monitors and rebalances the portfolio for the customer.

Money is invested in low-fee Exchange Traded Funds (ETFs) across multiple asset classes including Australian Shares, Global Shares, Emerging Markets Shares, Fixed Income and Gold.  It also provides the ability for its customers to personalise their portfolios with various investment themes. A strategic asset allocation strategy is used to optimise portfolio returns, and reduce volatility by asset class or geography.  Its investment philosophy is that investing in index-based ETFs provides better after-fee returns compared to actively managed portfolios in developed markets like Australia.

Controversy
In December 2016, Stockspot accidentally released the financial and personal details of customers.  According to the ABC report, Stockspot was unaware of the breach until they were contacted by the affected customer. CEO Chris Brycki confirmed that this was a one-off incident that affected a single client account and there was no financial risk to the client impacted.

Research
 Australian ETF Report : compares ETFs listed on the ASX across a range of metrics including fees, performance, distribution (dividend) yield and bid/ask spread.
 Stockspot Fat Cat Funds Report : identifies superannuation and managed investment funds that have performed particularly badly compared to their benchmark over a reasonable time period and consistently so.
 Stockspot/Galaxy Future Affordability Report : joint survey with Galaxy Research to look into parents’ concerns about young people’s finances, the cost of housing and living, and what do they think the fallout will be in later life for their children and themselves.

References

Robo-advisors
Financial services companies established in 2013
Financial services companies based in Sydney